Thomas Knox, 2nd Earl of Ranfurly (19 April 1786 – 21 March 1858), styled Viscount Northland between 1831 and 1840, was an Anglo-Irish peer and politician.

Background
Ranfurly was the eldest son of Thomas Knox, 1st Earl of Ranfurly, and the Hon. Diana Jane, daughter of Edmund Pery, 1st Viscount Pery. He gained the courtesy title Viscount Northland when his father was elevated to the earldom of Ranfurly in 1831. He studied at St John's College, Cambridge.

Political career
Ranfurly was returned to Parliament as one of two representatives for County Tyrone in 1812 (succeeding his father), a seat he held until 1818. Between 1818 and 1830 he was the sole representative for Dungannon in Parliament. In 1840 he succeeded his father in the earldom and entered the House of Lords as Baron Ranfurly.

Family
Lord Ranfurly married Mary Juliana, daughter of the Most Reverend William Stuart, Archbishop of Armagh in 1815. Mary Juliana's mother, Sophia Margaret Penn, was the daughter of Thomas Penn, a son of William Penn, founder of Pennsylvania. They had four sons and six daughters. He died in March 1858, aged 71, and was succeeded in the earldom by his eldest son, Thomas. Lady Ranfurly died in July 1866.

References

External links

1786 births
1858 deaths
Alumni of St John's College, Cambridge
Knox, Thomas
Knox, Thomas
Knox, Thomas
Knox, Thomas
Knox, Thomas
UK MPs who inherited peerages
Earls of Ranfurly